

Tunbeorht or Tunberht was a medieval Bishop of Winchester. He was consecrated between 871 and 877. He died between 878 and 879.

Citations

References

External links
 

Bishops of Winchester
9th-century English bishops
870s deaths
Year of birth unknown
Year of death uncertain